The 1940–41 Gauliga Bayern was the eighth season of the league, one of the 20 Gauligas in Germany at the time. It was the first tier of the football league system in  Bavaria (German:Bayern) from 1933 to 1945.

For TSV 1860 München it was the first of two Gauliga championships the club would win in the era from 1933 to 1944. The club qualified for the 1941 German football championship, where it was knocked out after finishing second in its group, behind group winner and eventual German champions SK Rapid Wien, and ahead of Stuttgarter Kickers and VfL Neckarau.

The seventh edition of the Tschammerpokal, now the DFB-Pokal, saw 1. FC Nürnberg as the best Gauliga Bayern club reach the third round, having reached the final in the previous two editions.

Table									
The 1940–41 season saw three new clubs in the league, Schwaben Augsburg, FC Wacker München and Würzburger Kickers. The league originally started with 13 clubs but TSV 1883 Nürnberg which had played as FSV Nürnberg in the previous season, withdrew during the season.

References

Sources

External links
 Das Deutsche Fussball Archiv  Historic German league tables

1940-41
1